The 2003 Men's South American Hockey Championship was the first edition of the Men's South American Hockey Championship,  the South American championship for men's national field hockey teams, organized by the PAHF. It was held from 16 until 23 March 2003 in Santiago, Chile.

Argentina won the first edition by finishing first in the round-robin tournament. As winners, Argentina qualified for the 2003 Pan American Games in Santo Domingo, Dominican Republic.

Tournament

Pool

Results
All times are local, CLST (UTC-3).

References

External links
PAHF page

Men's South American Hockey Championship
South American Championship
International field hockey competitions hosted by Chile
South American Hockey Championship Men
Sports competitions in Santiago
South American Hockey Championship Men
2000s in Santiago, Chile